The following is a list of British Turks, including people of full or partial ethnic Turkish origin with British citizenship.

The majority of notable British Turks come from the large Turkish Cypriot community, followed by ethnic Turks who originate from Turkey. In addition, there are notable British Turks who descend from other post-Ottoman modern nation-states which still have significant ethnic Turkish minorities. For example, from the Balkans, Silvena Rowe has a paternal Turkish Bulgarian background Moustafa Palazli has a Turkish Western Thracian background from Greece,.  From North Africa, Kasim Kutay has a paternal Turkish Egyptian background. Meanwhile, Egyptian-born Dodi Fayed was maternally of Turkish Saudi origin. From the Levant, Farah Zeynep Abdullah, Nemir Kirdar and Rena Kirdar have a Turkish Iraqi background; Rana Kabbani has a Turkish Syrian background; and Skandar Keynes and Soumaya Keynes have a maternal Turkish Lebanese background.

In addition, there are notable naturalised British citizens of Turkish origin who descend from the modern Turkish diaspora (i.e. from countries which were never part of the former Ottoman Empire). The majority are "Euro-Turks" who descend from Western Europe (e.g. Erol Gelenbe and Elif Shafak have a Turkish French background; Atif Bashir and Semra Eren-Nijhar have a Turkish German background). Some British Turks have also come from the diaspora in North America (e.g. Erdem Moralioğlu has a Turkish Canadian background).

Many notable British Turks have dual nationality, including British nationality and the country which they descend from (e.g. Cypriot, TRNC, Turkish, Bulgarian, Iraqi, etc.). Some British Turks have also moved to other parts of the modern Turkish diaspora where they have acquired another citizenship. This is most notable among the British-Turkish Cypriot diaspora; for example, in addition to their British citizenship, Hal Ozsan also has American citizenship; Mutlu Çerkez also has Australian citizenship; and Alkan Chaglar and Erol Kahraman both also have Canadian citizenship, etc.

Academia
Süleyman Başak,  Professor of Finance at the London Business School (Turkish Cypriot origin)
Mehmet Ismet Başaran, chemical engineer and philatelist
Müge Çevik, clinical lecturer in Infectious Diseases and Medical Virology at the University of St Andrews 
Mustafa Djamgoz, Professor of Cancer Biology at Imperial College London and Chairman of the College of Medicine’s Science Council (Turkish Cypriot origin)
Semra Eren-Nijhar, sociologist (Turkish German origin) 
Zakaria Erzinçlioğlu, renowned forensic entomologist (Turkish Hungarian origin)
Ten Feizi, Professor and Director of the Glycosciences Laboratory at Imperial College London (Turkish Cypriot origin) 
Erol Gelenbe, Chaired Professor, Imperial College and Polish Academy of Sciences (Turkish French origin) 
Rana Kabbani, cultural historian, writer and broadcaster (Turkish Syrian origin) 
Deniz Kandiyoti, Emeritus Professor of Development Studies at the SOAS University of London
Ziya Meral, researcher 
Gulnur Muradoglu, Professor of Behavioural Finance at Queen Mary University of London
Mustafa F. Özbilgin, Professor of Human Resource Management at Brunel University
Zehra Sayers, structural biologist
Ibrahim Sirkeci, Professor of Transnational Studies & Marketing at Regent's University London

Arts and literature 
 
 
Memo Akten, artist
Kutluğ Ataman, artist and film director
Ali Kemal Bey, Ottoman journalist
Alkan Chaglar, journalist (Turkish Cypriot origin)
Mutlu Çerkez, artist (Turkish Cypriot origin)
Tracey Emin, artist (Turkish Cypriot father)
Mehmet Ergen, theatre director and founder of Arcola Theatre
Fiore de Henriquez, Italian-born sculptor (Turkish and Russian mother; Spanish father; naturalised British citizen)
Mustafa Hulusi, artist (Turkish Cypriot origin)
Ümit Hussein, literary translator and interpreter (Turkish Cypriot origin) 
Yaşar İsmailoğlu, poet (Turkish Cypriot origin)
Rachel Johnson, journalist, television presenter, and author (Turkish great-grandfather)
Soumaya Keynes, trade and globalization editor at The Economist magazine (Turkish Lebanese mother)
Rena Kirdar, writer (Turkish Iraqi origin) 
Arif Ozakca, artist (Turkish Cypriot origin)
Elif Shafak, novelist (Turkish French origin; naturalised British citizen)
Robert Paul Weston, children's author (British-Turkish father)

Business
 
Mehmet Dalman, investment banker and  chairman of Welsh football club Cardiff City (Turkish Cypriot origin)
Mev Dinc, video game designer
Ali Guryel, founder of Bromcom (Turkish Cypriot origin)
Hattie Hasan, CEO of the Stopcocks Women Plumbers (Turkish Cypriot parents)
Nemir Kirdar, billionaire; founder of Investcorp (Turkish-Iraqi origin) 
Kasim Kutay, CEO of Novo Holdings A/S (Turkish Egyptian father)
 Khaled Mardam-Bey, software developer and creator of mIRC (Turkish Syrian origin)
Asil Nadir, businessman (Turkish Cypriot origin)
Shaha Riza, World Bank staffer (Turkish Libyan father)
Touker Suleyman, fashion retail entrepreneur and a "dragon" on Dragon's Den (Turkish Cypriot origin)
Lev Tanju, founder of Palace Skateboards (Turkish father)

Cinema and television
 
 
 

Farah Zeynep Abdullah, actress (Turkish Iraqi father and Turkish/Macedonian/Bosnian mother) 
Nej Adamson, actor (Turkish Cypriot origin)
Yashaw Adem, actor
Josef Altin, actor
Sertan Baykara, broadcast journalist and presenter (Turkish German origin) 
Feri Cansel, actress (Turkish Cypriot origin)
Zümrüt Cansel, actress (Turkish Cypriot origin)
Ekin-Su Cülcüloğlu, actress, model and TV personality
Kem Cetinay, TV personality and rapper (Turkish Cypriot origin) 
Aslı Enver, actress (Turkish Cypriot father and Turkish mother)
Bilge Ebiri, film critic and filmmaker
Dodi Fayed, film producer and partner of Diana, Princess of Wales (Egyptian-born to Samira Khashoggi who was of Turkish Saudi origin)
Mem Ferda, actor (Turkish Cypriot origin)
Ayda Field, American-born actress, panelist on Loose Women and The X Factor (Turkish father) 
Akin Gazi, actor (Turkish Cypriot origin)
Sienna Guillory, actress (Cuban-Turkish origin)
Tamer Hassan, actor (Turkish Cypriot origin)
Belle Hassan, Season 5 of Love Island (Turkish Cypriot father)
Aykut Hilmi, actor (Turkish Cypriot origin)
Seline Hizli, actress 
Metin Hüseyin, film director (Turkish Cypriot origin)
Yıldız Kenter, actress (Turkish father)
Skandar Keynes, actor (Turkish Lebanese origin)
Erim Metto, film director (Turkish Cypriot origin)
Mem Morrison, actor (Turkish Cypriot origin)
Erkan Mustafa, actor (Turkish Cypriot origin)
Cosh Omar, actor (Turkish Cypriot origin)
Hal Ozsan, Hollywood actor (Turkish Cypriot origin)
Moustafa Palazli, actor (Turkish Western Thracian origin) 
Tolga Safer, actor (Turkish Cypriot origin)
Meliz Serman, stage actress (Turkish Cypriot origin)
Kemal Shahin, Big Brother contestant (Turkish Cypriot origin) 
Anna Silk, actress (Canadian-born to a British-Turkish Cypriot mother) 
Ilkay Silk, actress, playwright, producer, and educator (Turkish Cypriot origin)
Ayşe Tezel, actress (Turkish father)
Aden Theobald, Big Brother contestant (Turkish Cypriot mother)
Sezer Yurtseven, Big Brother contestant (Turkish Cypriot origin)
Anatol Yusef, actor (Turkish Cypriot origin)

Fashion
 
Bora Aksu, fashion designer
Mert Alas, fashion photographer
Mustafa Aslanturk, fashion designer (Turkish Cypriot origin)
Hussein Chalayan, MBE, fashion designer (Turkish Cypriot origin)
Dilara Fındıkoğlu, fashion designer
Lara Johnson-Wheeler, arts and fashion journalist and model
Nasir Mazhar, fashion designer (Turkish Cypriot origin)
Erdem Moralioğlu fashion designer (Canadian-born to a Turkish father)
Funda Önal, model
Rifat Ozbek, fashion designer

Food
Selin Kiazim, chef and winner of the Great British Menu (Turkish Cypriot origin)
Hüseyin Özer, celebrity chef
Silvena Rowe, celebrity chef and food writer (Turkish Bulgarian father)

House of Osman
Prince Azmet Jah, professional photographer (son of Ottoman Princess Esra)
Dürrüşehvar Sultan,
Naz Osmanoglu, comedian and 19th in line to the former Ottoman throne

Law
Gönül Başaran Erönen, judge in the TRNC Supreme Court (Turkish Cypriot origin)

Music

 
  

Erol Alkan, DJ and producer (Turkish Cypriot origin)
Peri Aziz, singer and former member of Babutsa (Turkish Cypriot origin) 
Abs Breen, singer and former member of the former boy band Five (Turkish father)
Mine Dogantan-Dack, concert pianist and musicologist/music theorist; Performance Teaching Associate at the University of Cambridge
Salih Can Gevrek, pianist 
Yusuf Güney, singer 
Adam Harison, singer-songwriter; appeared on Little Mix The Search; and pitch invader during the 2020 UEFA European Football Championship final match (Turkish Cypriot origin)
Atila Huseyin, jazz singer (Turkish Cypriot origin)
Adem Ilhan, musician
Jax Jones, DJ, songwriter, record producer and remixer (Turkish father) 
Işın Karaca, singer (Turkish Cypriot mother and Turkish father)
Tolga Kashif, music conductor (Turkish Cypriot origin)
, singer (Turkish Cypriot origin)
Alexis Korner, musician (Turkish/Greek/Austrian mother)
Gulsin Onay, concert pianist
Murat Onay, rapper and singer-songwriter
Lara Ömeroğlu, pianist 
Tony Perry, Wembley Stadium DJ; introduced the song Sweet Caroline as England’s unofficial anthem during the 2020 UEFA European Football Championship (Turkish Cypriot origin)
Sav Remzi, record producer (Turkish Cypriot origin)
Ziynet Sali, singer (Turkish Cypriot origin)
Ali Sönmez, lead singer of Babutsa (Turkish Cypriot origin)
Tash, singer (Turkish Cypriot origin)
Hakan Tuna, rock musician; member of the band Natural Life (Turkish Cypriot origin)
Soner Türsoy, member of Babutsa(Turkish Cypriot origin)
Nilüfer Yanya, singer-songwriter, composer and musician (Turkish father) 
B Young, rapper and singer-songwriter (Turkish Cypriot origin)

Religion
Ramadan Güney, founder of the first Turkish mosque in the UK (Shacklewell Lane Mosque); and former owner of the UK's largest cemetery Brookwood Cemetery (Turkish Cypriot origin)

Politics 

Peray Ahmet, leader of Haringey London Borough Council (Turkish Cypriot origin)
Tim Aker, Member of the European Parliament in 2014-19 (Turkish father)
Nesil Caliskan, Enfield London Borough Council's first female leader (Turkish Cypriot origin)
Mete Coban, Labour Councillor for Stoke Newington; founder of My Life My Say (Turkish Cypriot origin)
Baroness Meral Ece, Liberal Democrats member of the House of Lords (Turkish Cypriot origin)
Emma Edhem, councilwoman of the City of London Corporation (Turkish Cypriot origin)
Richard Hickmet, Conservative MP in 1983-87 (Turkish Cypriot origin)
Boris Johnson, former Prime Minister of the United Kingdom (Turkish great-grandfather)
Jo Johnson, politician (Turkish great-grandfather)
Stanley Johnson, Member of the European Parliament in 1979-84 (Turkish grandfather)
Alp Mehmet MVO, British Ambassador to Iceland in 2004 (Turkish Cypriot origin)
Özdil Nami, Minister of Foreign Affairs of Northern Cyprus (Turkish Cypriot origin)
Sabri Ozaydin, Mayor of Enfield
Kenan Poleo, British Consul General and Trade Commissioner for Eastern Europe and Central Asia. (Turkish Cypriot origin)

Sports
 
 
 
 
 
Matthew Metin Ahmet, Shaolin Kung Fu
Yusuf Aydin, rugby player (Turkish father)
Daniel Barlaser, football player (Turkish father) 
Atif Bashir, football player (Turkish German mother)
Neşet Bellikli, football player 
Adam Booth, boxing trainer and manager of David Haye (Turkish Cypriot father)
Rhian Brewster, football player (Turkish Cypriot mother) 
, football player 
Andrew Chandler, professional golfer
Kamil Ahmet Çörekçi, football player (Turkish Cypriot origin)
Umit Eminoglu, football player 
Hasan Er, Deaflympics football player 
Hüseyin Er, Deaflympics football player 
Murat Erdoğan, football player (Turkish Cypriot origin)
Hakan Hayrettin, football player (Turkish Cypriot origin)
Hale Hüseyin, football player and captain of the England U-18 Women's National Team (Turkish Cypriot origin)
Mustafa Hussein, football player (Turkish Cypriot origin)
Kemal Izzet, football player (Turkish Cypriot origin)
Muzzy Izzet, football player (Turkish Cypriot origin)
Erol Kahraman, ice hockey player (Turkish Cypriot parents) 
Jem Karacan, football player (Turkish Cypriot origin)
Colin Kazim-Richards, football player (Turkish Cypriot mother)
Kaan Kevser-Junior, football player
Eren Kinali, football player 
Dervis Konuralp, Paralympic swimmer (Turkish Cypriot father)
Billy Mehmet, football player (Turkish Cypriot origin)
Dave Mehmet, football player (Turkish Cypriot origin)
Deniz Mehmet, football player (Turkish Cypriot origin)
Yusuf Mersin, football player 
Sam Mussabini, athletics coach (Italian-Turkish parents)
Tarkan Mustafa, football player (Turkish Cypriot origin)
Erhun Oztumer, football player (Turkish Cypriot origin)
Ahmet Patterson, boxer (Turkish Cypriot father)
Omer Riza, football player (Turkish Cypriot origin)
Danis Salman, football player (Turkish Cypriot origin)
Jason Tahincioglu, racecar driver 
Mumtaz Tahincioglu, President of the Turkish Motorsports Federation 
Aryan Tajbakhsh, football player (Turkish Iranian origin) 
Mustafa Tiryaki, football player 
Acelya Toprak, youngest winner at the European Judo Championships (Turkish Cypriot origin)
Tamer Tuna, football player (Turkish Cypriot father) 
Jansin Turgut, rugby player (Turkish father) 
Fatima Whitbread, javelin thrower (Turkish Cypriot origin)
Lev Yalcin, football player (Turkish father)
Halil Zorba, weightlifter (Turkish Cypriot origin)

Victims of crime
Patrick Azimkar, British soldier killed during the Massereene Barracks shooting in 2009 (Turkish Cypriot father)  
Aysha Frade, victim killed during the 2017 Westminster attack (Turkish Cypriot father)
Martyn Hett, victim killed during the 2017 Manchester Arena bombing (Turkish mother)
Necati Zontul, tortured in detention in Greece because of his sexual orientation

Others
Arifs, criminal gang (Turkish Cypriot origin)

See also 
Turks in the United Kingdom
Turks in London
List of British people

References

External links 
Most Successful Turks (UK)

English people of Turkish descent
Turkish
British
Turkish